João Roberto Custódio (born 31 December 1987), commonly known as Betinho, is a Brazilian footballer who plays for Sampaio Corrêa as a defensive midfielder.

Career
Born in São Paulo, Betinho made his senior debuts for Engenheiro Beltrão in 2009. In 2011, he moved to Noroeste, and made his professional debut on 20 February 2011, coming on as a second half substitute in a 0–2 away loss against São Bernardo FC for the Campeonato Paulista championship.

In January 2013 Betinho signed for Grêmio Osasco. In May, after appearing regularly, he joined Série B's Boa Esporte; he rescinded with the latter on 29 October 2014.

On 5 January 2015 Betinho signed for Portuguesa, freshly relegated to Série C.

References

External links

1987 births
Living people
Footballers from São Paulo
Brazilian footballers
Association football midfielders
Campeonato Brasileiro Série B players
Esporte Clube Noroeste players
Boa Esporte Clube players
Associação Portuguesa de Desportos players
Oeste Futebol Clube players